Ilama is a municipality in the department of Santa Bárbara, Honduras.

The last census registered 2,476 people. The patron saint is the Virgin of Lourdes and her name is celebrated in the municipality February 11/12.

Demographics
At the time of the 2013 Honduras census, Ilama municipality had a population of 9,058. Of these, 97.02% were Mestizo, 1.50% White, 1.14% Indigenous (1.03% Lenca) and 0.34% Black or Afro-Honduran.

References

Municipalities of the Santa Bárbara Department, Honduras